There are two mausolea known as Miles Mausoleum in the United States.

Miles Mausoleum in Arlington National Cemetery
The Miles Mausoleum is located in Section 3 of the Arlington National Cemetery.

Many members and descendants of the Miles Family (Lieutenant General Nelson Appleton Miles and Major General Sherman Miles) are buried in this mausoleum on a hill in Section 3 of Arlington National Cemetery.

It is one of only two mausolea located within the confines of the Cemetery. The only other one belongs to the family of General Thomas Crook Sullivan and it is located in Section 1.

Miles Mausoleum in Illinois

Stephen Miles, a veteran of the War of 1812, was buried here by his son Stephen W. Miles.  The mausoleum is located atop Eagle Cliff midway between Columbia and Valmeyer in what is known variously as Eagle Cliff Cemetery or Miles Cemetery in Waterloo, Illinois.  Due to its size and position on the bluff, the mausoleum is visible from several miles away, and has thus gained a prominent position in local legend.  It has been a frequent target for vandals, and as a result all bodies were removed and reburied elsewhere; the fifty-six crypts are now empty and open, and the door to the mausoleum is gone. At this time a renovation of the mausoleum is underway, and cameras are set up on the premises to monitor the mausoleum and surrounding cemetery property.

References

External links
 Miles Mausoleum in Illinois:
 Graveyards of Illinois

Arlington National Cemetery
Mausoleums in the United States
Death in Illinois
Waterloo, Illinois
Monuments and memorials in Illinois
Monuments and memorials in Virginia
Buildings and structures in Arlington, Virginia
Death in Virginia